Ladislav Vidumanský (born 9 July 1961) is a Slovak water polo player. He competed in the men's tournament at the 1992 Summer Olympics.

References

1961 births
Living people
Slovak male water polo players
Olympic water polo players of Czechoslovakia
Water polo players at the 1992 Summer Olympics
Sportspeople from Košice